Bilathikuzhal  is a 2018 Indian Malayalam-language film directed by Vinu Kolichal.

Set in two periods, which showcases the protagonist's childhood and old age, the film tells his attachment with Bilathikuzhal. The film won the 2018 John Abraham Award for Best Malayalam Film.

Plot

Official selection in various festivals
The film had its premiere at Jio MAMI Mumbai Film Festival 2018 and was later selected in NDFC Film Bazaar's Industry Screening 2018. It also had its selection in International Film Festival of Kerala(IFFK) 2018. It was also included in Artist's Cinema Section in KOCHI-MUZIRIS BIENNALE 2018.

References

External links
 Bilathikuzhal (English Barrel) Trailer | Jio MAMI 20th Mumbai Film Festival with Star

2018 films